Chongxian may refer to:

Xuedou Chongxian (980–1052), Chinese Buddhist monk
Chongxian Township, Xinfeng County, Ganzhou, Jiangxi, China
Chongxian Township, Xingguo County, Ganzhou, Jiangxi, China
Chongxian Subdistrict, Yuhang District, Hangzhou, Zhejiang, China